Euplatypus is a genus of pinhole borers in the subfamily Platypodinae of weevils Curculionidae. There are at least 50 described species in Euplatypus.

Species
These 55 species belong to the genus Euplatypus:

 Euplatypus aequalicinctus (Schedl, 1948) c
 Euplatypus alienus (Schedl, 1963) c
 Euplatypus alternans (Chapuis, 1865) c
 Euplatypus angustatulus (Wood, 1966) c
 Euplatypus angustatus (Chapuis, 1865) c
 Euplatypus angustioris (Schedl, 1948) c
 Euplatypus araucariae (Schedl, 1966) c
 Euplatypus areolatus (Chapuis, 1865) c
 Euplatypus bellus (Schedl, 1933) c
 Euplatypus bilobatus (Strohmeyer, 1911) c
 Euplatypus compositus (Say, 1824) c b
 Euplatypus contextus (Schedl, 1963) c
 Euplatypus coronatus (Schedl, 1933) c
 Euplatypus costaricensis (Schedl, 1936) c
 Euplatypus cribricollis (Brandford, 1896) c
 Euplatypus cuspidatus ((Schedl, 1963) c
 Euplatypus decorus (Schedl, 1936) c
 Euplatypus dignatus (Schedl, 1936) c
 Euplatypus dimidiatus (Chapuis, 1865) c
 Euplatypus dissimilis (Chapuis, 1865) c
 Euplatypus dissipabilis (Schedl, 1934) c
 Euplatypus efferatus (Schedl, 1935) c
 Euplatypus haagi (Chapuis, 1865) c
 Euplatypus hians (Chapuis, 1865) c
 Euplatypus hintzi (Schaufuss, 1897) c
 Euplatypus immunis (Schedl, 1959) c
 Euplatypus laminatus (Schedl, 1964) c
 Euplatypus longior (Wood, 1966) c
 Euplatypus longius (Wood, 1966) c
 Euplatypus longulus (Chapuis, 1865) c
 Euplatypus madagascariensis (Chapuis, 1865) c
 Euplatypus minusculus (Schedl, 1936) c
 Euplatypus mulsanti (Chapuis, 1865) c
 Euplatypus otiosus (Schedl, 1936) c
 Euplatypus parallelus (Fabricius, 1801} c b
 Euplatypus patulus (Chapuis, 1865) c
 Euplatypus permimicus (Schedl, 1936) c
 Euplatypus pertusus (Chapuis, 1865) c
 Euplatypus pini (Hopkins, 1905) c b
 Euplatypus porosus (Blandford, 1896) c
 Euplatypus pseudolongulus (Schedl, 1936) c
 Euplatypus pulicaris (Chapuis, 1865) c
 Euplatypus roberti (Chapuis, 1865) c
 Euplatypus rugosifrons (Schedl, 1963) c
 Euplatypus santacruzensis (Mutchler, 1925) c
 Euplatypus segnis (Chapuis, 1865) c
 Euplatypus sinuosus (Chapuis, 1865) c
 Euplatypus solutus (Schedl, 1933) c
 Euplatypus striatus (Chapuis, 1865) c
 Euplatypus tragus (Schedl, 1939) c
 Euplatypus tricuspidatus (Schedl, 1954) c
 Euplatypus trispinatulus (Schedl, 1970) c
 Euplatypus trispinatus (Schedl, 1952) c
 Euplatypus truncatus (Chapuis, 1865) c
 Euplatypus vicinus (Blandford, 1896) c

Data sources: i = ITIS, c = Catalogue of Life, g = GBIF, b = Bugguide.net

Note: Authors of names listed here are as reported in. The "authors" listed in ITIS, GBIF, etc. (cited as "references") are the names of the authors of a recent catalog, not the authors of the taxa.

References

Further reading

External links

 

Platypodinae